Charles Townshend (27 August 1725 – 4 September 1767) was a British politician who held various titles in the Parliament of Great Britain. His establishment of the controversial Townshend Acts is considered one of the key causes of the American Revolution.

Early life
He was born at his family's seat 
of Raynham Hall in Norfolk, England, the second son of Charles Townshend, 3rd Viscount Townshend, and Audrey (died  1788), daughter and heiress of Edward Harrison of Ball's Park, near Hertford. He was a sickly child, suffered from epilepsy, and had a strained relationship with his parents. Townshend was a brash young man, whose "wonderful endowments [were] dashed with follies and indiscretions." Charles graduated from the Dutch Leiden University on 27 October 1745;  while there he had associated with a small group of other English youth, who later became well known in various circles, including Dowdeswell, Wilkes, and Alexander Carlyle. The latter would chronicle their exploits in his Autobiography.

Following his return in 1746, he represented Great Yarmouth in Parliament until 1756, when he found a seat for the admiralty borough of Saltash, subsequently transferring in 1761 to Harwich, another borough where the seat was in the government's gift. Public attention was first drawn to his abilities in 1753, when he delivered a lively attack against Lord Hardwicke's marriage bill, although this measure passed into law.

Politics
From 1749 - April 1754, Townshend was a member of the Board of Trade. It was during this time that he first showed an interest in increasing British powers of taxation and control over the American colonies. In 1754 and 1755, he served as Lord of the Admiralty, but at the close of 1755, his passionate attack against the policy of the ministry caused his resignation. In the administration which was formed in November 1756, and which was ruled by William Pitt the Elder, the lucrative office of treasurer of the chamber was given to Townshend, but he retired the following Spring and George Grenville took over. The higher post of First Lord of the Admiralty then fell to Townshend's lot and his refusal to accept the nomination led to his exclusion from the new administration.

In the dying days of Grenville's cabinet, to retain the administration of Lord Rockingham, Townshend accepted the position of Paymaster of The Forces, though he questioned the stability of the administration, calling it a "mere Lute-string administration" and stating that it was "pretty 'summer wear', but it will never stand the winter."

Under the ministry of William Pitt the Elder, Townshend accepted the role of Chancellor of the Exchequer in August 1766. A few weeks later his urgent appeals to the Prime Minister for increased power were favorably answered, and he was admitted to the inner circle of the cabinet. The new chancellor proposed the continuance of the land tax at four shillings in the pound, while he held out hopes that it might be reduced next year to three shillings, whereupon his predecessor, William Dowdeswell, by the aid of the landed gentlemen, carried a motion that the reduction should take effect at once. Townshend pledged to find revenue in America with which to meet the deficiency caused by the reduction. 

Early in 1767, shortly after The Stamp Act was repealed owing to colonial protests and boycotts of British goods, Townshend proposed that the Parliament could procure revenue from the Americans without causing them offense via "external" import taxes instead of internal taxes. These were known as the Townshend Acts.  The Acts passed resolutions for taxing several exports to America, such as glass, paint, paper and tea. The Townshend Acts established a Board of Commissioners in Boston to enforce them, which was seen as a threat to the American colonial tradition of self-government. He estimated these export taxes would produce a sum of £40,000 for the English treasury. He had the support of his cousin Thomas Townshend who was also a minister in the government. The Townshend Acts would be Townshend's last official act before his death.

Soon after that he died somewhat suddenly of a fever on  September 4, 1767.

Private life
In August 1755 he had married Caroline Campbell (d. 1794), the eldest daughter of John Campbell, 2nd Duke of Argyll and the widow of Francis Scott, Earl of Dalkeith, the eldest son of Francis Scott, 2nd Duke of Buccleuch.

Townshend's wife was created (August 1767) baroness Greenwich, and his elder brother George Townshend, 1st Marquess Townshend, was made Lord-lieutenant of Ireland.

Townshend conceived a great and dangerous passion for his step-daughter Frances Douglas, Lady Douglas, and her memorialist, Lady Louisa Stuart, wrote after his death of his character:
This was careless, gay, inconsiderate, volatile, seemingly foreign to every serious reflection or feeling. He had one of those happy tempers which nothing can ruffle, without a grain of pride, sternness or resentment in his nature. Ready to laugh with every body and at every thing, he poured out wit in torrents; and it was so much the worse for truth if ever truth stood in wit's way.

The American towns of Townsend, Massachusetts and Townshend, Vermont were founded and named after Charles Townshend in 1732 and 1753, respectively.  Raynham, Massachusetts was also named after him.

References

Lady Louisa Stuart, Memoire of Frances, Lady Douglas (Edinburgh and London, Scottish Academic Press, 1985)
William Edward Hartpole Lecky, History of England (1892);
Horace Walpole, Memoirs of the Reign of George III., edited by G. F. R. Barker (1894)
Reuben Percy and Sholto Percy (1823) The Percy Anecdotes, 1823; online text.

Memoir (1866) by Percy Fitzgerald

1725 births
1767 deaths
18th-century English nobility
18th-century English politicians
Charles Townshend
Members of the Privy Council of Great Britain
Younger sons of viscounts
Members of the Parliament of Great Britain for Saltash
Members of the Parliament of Great Britain for English constituencies
British MPs 1747–1754
British MPs 1754–1761
British MPs 1761–1768
Politics of the Borough of Great Yarmouth
Chancellors of the Exchequer of Great Britain
Lords of the Admiralty
Paymasters of the Forces
Presidents of the Board of Trade
British officials in the American Revolution
People with epilepsy
Leiden University alumni
People from North Norfolk (district)